Ancara obliterans is a moth of the family Noctuidae first described by Francis Walker in 1858. It is found in Sri Lanka, India, Malaysia, Sumatra and Borneo.

References

Moths of Asia
Moths described in 1858
Acronictinae